Léonce Ngendakumana is a Burundian politician who was President of the National Assembly of Burundi from 1995–1996, and again from 1998–2002. He was born in 1954 in the province of Bujumbura, to a modest family. He launched his political career at a young age when he became politically active in the BAMPERE party, until the creation of the Burundi Workers' Party (UBU).

He was one of the founders of the Front for Democracy in Burundi (FRODÉBU), and in 2006, he became its secretary-general.

Electoral Mandates
He was elected to represent Bujumbura in the National Assembly. In 1995, he became President of the Assembly, holding that post until 2002. He was re-elected as deputy in the 2005 elections but his party, FRODÉBU, failed to gain control of the Assembly.

References

Burundian politicians
Presidents of the National Assembly (Burundi)
Living people
1954 births
Front for Democracy in Burundi politicians